The 2006 FINA Men's Water Polo World League  was the fifth edition of the annual event, organised by the world's governing body in aquatics, the FINA. After a preliminary round and a semifinal round, the Super Final was held in Athens, Greece.

Preliminary round

Three teams from each pool advanced to the semifinal round. The semifinal round hosts (Spain and the United States) were guaranteed qualification, as was the Super Final host (Greece).

Group A

Group B

Group C

Group D

Semifinal round

Three teams from each pool advanced to the final round. The final round hosts (Greece) were guaranteed qualification.

Group A

Group B

Super Final

Group round

The top two teams advanced to the final, while the other four played for bronze.

3rd to 6th place playoffs

5th place match

Bronze medal match

Gold medal match

Final ranking

Awards

References

 Sports123

2006
W
W
International water polo competitions hosted by Greece
Sports competitions in Athens